The 2016 Colonial Athletic Association women's soccer season was the 13th season in the conference since its inaugural season in 1993.

Changes from 2015 

 None

Teams

Stadia and locations

Regular season

Rankings

Postseason

CAA tournament

NCAA tournament

All-CAA awards and teams

See also 
 2016 NCAA Division I women's soccer season
 2016 CAA Women's Soccer Tournament
 2016 Colonial Athletic Association men's soccer season

References 

 
2016 NCAA Division I women's soccer season